Preston Elmer Peden (June 28, 1914 –  June 27, 1985) was an American politician and a U.S. Representative from Oklahoma.

Early life and education
Born in Duke, Oklahoma, Peden moved to Altus, Oklahoma, in 1920. Following his public school education, he attended the University of Oklahoma at Norman, Oklahoma, receiving his A.B. in 1936, and from the law school of the same university, his LL.B. in 1939.

Career
Peden was admitted to the bar in 1939 and commenced the practice of law in Altus, Oklahoma. He became the Attorney for the State Insurance Fund of the State of Oklahoma (1939–1942).

He enlisted in June 1942 as a private in the United States Army. He was promoted through the ranks to Captain, being discharged May 5, 1946, and was awarded Bronze Star. He married German nurse Ursula Wendt on December 24, 1945, in Bavaria and they had four children. His eldest was son Robert, followed by daughters Marsha & Gretchen & youngest son Thomas, who was always referred to as "stam" as in 'stampeden'  .  While serving overseas Peden sent a notification and declaration for the office of Congressman to the election board and subsequently received the nomination.

Peden was elected as a Democrat to the 80th Congress (January 3, 1947 – January 3, 1949),  and was an unsuccessful candidate for renomination in 1948. He served as staff member of the Public Lands Committee of the United States House of Representatives in May 1949. He was appointed Alaskan regional counsel, Bureau of Land Management, Department of the Interior, in 1950 and Counsel to House Committee on Interior and Insular Affairs 1950-1952. He served as director of governmental affairs of the Chicago Association of Commerce and Industry from 1954 to 1980, while a resident of La Grange, Illinois.

Death
Peden moved to Walnut Creek, California, and lived there until his death on June 27, 1985, (age 70 years, 364 days). His burial location is unknown.

References

External links

 Retrieved on 2008-07-31
Preston E. Peden Collection and Photograph Collection at the Carl Albert Center

1914 births
1985 deaths
People from Jackson County, Oklahoma
University of Oklahoma alumni
University of Oklahoma College of Law alumni
Oklahoma lawyers
United States Army officers
United States Army personnel of World War II
People from Walnut Creek, California
People from La Grange, Illinois
Democratic Party members of the United States House of Representatives from Oklahoma
People from Altus, Oklahoma
20th-century American politicians
20th-century American lawyers
Military personnel from California
Military personnel from Illinois